The Protestant Church in Indonesia is a Reformed church; it is a member of World Communion of Reformed Churches.

Origin
The Protestant Church in Indonesia was formed in Ambon, Maluku in 1605 under the name of the Protestant Church in the Netherlands Indies, in Dutch De Protestantsche Kerk in Nederlandsch-Indië. In 1619, the headquarters was moved to Batavia. The denomination inherited the missions left by the Portuguese. The church supported missions all over Indonesia. Its territories cover several areas like the Maluku Islands, Minahasa, Java, Sumatra, East Nusa Tenggara.

Member churches
In the 1930s, the church spread rapidly. The church composed of 12 autonomous churches
Evangelical Christian Church in Timor,
Protestant Church in Western Indonesia,
Christian Evangelical Church in Minahasa,
Protestant Church of Maluku,
Protestant Church in Indonesia in Papua,
Evangelical Christian Church in Taulud - 17,437 members
Indonesian Protestant Church in Gorontalo - 11,103 member
Indonesian Protestant Church in Donggala - 30,114 members
Indonesian Protestant Church Baggai Kepulawan - 29,008 members
Indonesian Protestant Church Buol Tolitoli - 11,027 members
Christian Church Luwuk Banggai - 42,611 members
Indonesian Ecumenical Christian Church - 188 members

In the 20th century, it adopted a more Presbyterian church order. It has 4,800 congregations and 3.1 million members.

References

External links

Official website

Protestant denominations established in the 17th century
Reformed denominations in Indonesia
Religious organizations established in 1605